Juan Cardenas (b. at Seville, 1613; d. 6 June 1684) was a Spanish Jesuit moral theologian and author. He entered the Society of Jesus at the age of fourteen, and during many years held in it the office of rector, master of novices, and provincial.

Works

He composed several small ascetical treatises: "Seven Meditations on Jesus Crucified" (originally published at Seville, 1678) and "Geminum sidus Mariani diadematis" (Lyons, 1673). From his pen we also have two pious biographies: "Historia de la Vida y Virtudes de la Venerable Virgen Damiana de las Llangas" (Seville, 1675) and "Breve relación de la Muerte, Vida, y Virtudes del Venerabile Cavallero D. Miguel Manara Vincentelo de Leca" (Seville, 1679).

He is chiefly remembered for his contributions to moral theology, which won praise from Alphonsus Ligouri. He examined some of the moral opinions prevalent in his day, especially those tinged with Laxism, in his well-known "Crisis theologica bipartita, sive Desputationes selectæ" (Lyons, 1670). This work, which appeared in two parts, opened up a storm of controversy, and in the edition of 1680 he reasserted his position in a supplement which defended moderate Probabilism against the twofold attacks of Laxists and Rigorists. 

In the Venetian editions of 1694, 1700, and 1710 there were first published, together with these three parts, and explanation of the propositions condemned by the pope in 1679. This last work, of which Father P. J. Kugler, S.J., composed a compendium in 1704, has often been published separately under the title: Crisis theologica in qua plures selectæ difficultates ex morali theologia ad lydium veritatis lapidem revocantur ex regula morem positâ a SS. D.N. Innocentis XI P.M., etc.

References

Attribution
 The entry cites:
Nicolas Antonio: Bibliotheca Hispana nova. Madrid, 1783, I, 671; 
Ribadeneira-Sotwell: Bibliotheca Scriptorum S.J. Rome, 1676; 
Augustin de Backer and Carlos Sommervogel: Bibliothèque de la c de J. Brussels, Paris, 1891, II, col. 734-37; 
De Backer: Bibliographie des éscrevains de la c. de J. Liège, 1869, I, col. 1078; 
Hugo von Hurter: Nomenclator. Innsbruck, 1876, II, p. 1, 231; 
Ignaz von Döllinger & Franz Heinrich Reusch: Geschichte der Moralstreitigkeiten in der Römisch-katholischen Kirche. Nördlingen, 1889, I, 39, 41, 46.

1613 births
1684 deaths
17th-century Spanish Jesuits
17th-century Spanish Roman Catholic theologians